The discography of Jamie Cullum, a British pop and jazz-pop singer-songwriter and multi-instrumentalist, consists of nine studio albums, four compilation albums, one live album, and 32 singles.

Albums

Studio albums

Live album

Compilation albums

Singles

As lead artist

As featured artist

Video albums
 Live at Blenheim Palace (2004)
 Twentysomething DVD (2004) 
 Telling Tales (2005) – with Catching Tales Special Edition
 Live in Buenos Aires (2006)

Music videos

Production and songwriting
These are writing and production credits for music outside of Jamie Cullum's own solo work.

Other appearances

Footnotes

References

Cullum, Jamie
Jazz discographies